Erich Schärer (born 1 September 1946 in Zurich) is a Swiss bobsledder who competed from the early 1970s to the mid-1980s. Competing in two Winter Olympics, he won four medals with one gold (Two-man: 1980), two silvers (Four-man: 1976, 1980), and one bronze (Two-man: 1976).

Schärer also won fourteen medals at the FIBT World Championships with seven golds (Two-man: 1978, 1979, 1982; Four-man: 1971, 1973, 1975, 1986), three silvers (Two-man: 1983, Four-man: 1977, 1978), and four bronzes (Two-man: 1981, Four-man: 1979, 1981, 1982). The first two titles he won as pusher in the team of driver René Stadler before a became a driver himself.

References
 Bobsleigh two-man Olympic medalists 1932-56 and since 1964
 Bobsleigh four-man Olympic medalists for 1924, 1932-56, and since 1964
 Bobsleigh two-man world championship medalists since 1931
 Bobsleigh four-man world championship medalists since 1930
 Brainyhistory.com profile
 DatabaseOlympics.com profile
 

1946 births
Bobsledders at the 1976 Winter Olympics
Bobsledders at the 1980 Winter Olympics
Living people
Swiss male bobsledders
Olympic bobsledders of Switzerland
Olympic gold medalists for Switzerland
Olympic silver medalists for Switzerland
Olympic bronze medalists for Switzerland
Olympic medalists in bobsleigh
Medalists at the 1976 Winter Olympics
Medalists at the 1980 Winter Olympics
Sportspeople from Zürich